Anayirangal Dam (Malayalam: ആനയിറങ്കൽ അണക്കെട്ട്) is a dam built on the Panniyar River in Chinnakanal and Shanthampara panchayats, 22 km from Munnar in Idukki district of Kerala, India The dam is surrounded on one side by forest and on the other by Tata Tea Plantation. The dam is located near the Kumily-Munnar road. The water flowing from the dam reaches Kuthungal and Ponmudi dams through the Panniyar river. Power is generated at Kuthungal and Panniyar powerhouses. The dam stores water from small streams flowing from Bealram and rainwater flowing from the hills on the Tamil Nadu border. The reservoir usually fills up in June and July.

The project is situated in Mudirapuzha basin, a sub basin of Periyar River. The reservoir is created by constructing a dam at Anayirankal. The dam has ungated spill way system. The water stored in the reservoir is released to the river downstream through an outlet. This water is diverted by an overflow barrage at Kuthungal to Kuthungal Power House. After generation of power the water is released to Ponmudi reservoir at the downstream. The water from the Ponmudi reservoir is diverted to Panniyar Power station located on the left bank of Mudirapuzha and released back to Mudirapuzha river and flows downstream to kallarkutty reservoir. From there the river flows through taluks of Udumpanchola, Devikulam, Kothamangalam, Muvattupuzha, Kunnathunadu, Aluva, Kodungalloor, Paravur.

Specifications
Latitude : 10⁰ 00′ 20" N
Longitude: 77⁰ 12′ 30" E
Type of Dam : Earthen dam
Classification : HH (High Height)
Panchayath : Santhanpara
Village : Pooppara, Chinnakanal, Rajakumari
District : Idukki
 River : Panniyar
Height from deepest foundation : 34.14 m
Length : 326.13 m
Full Reservoir Level ( FRL) : EL 1207.02 m
Storage at FRL : 50.68 Mm3

Reservoir

Reservoir is formed by impounding the Panniyar river. There is a second reservoir made by Ponmudi dam which is part of the Panniyar project.

 Full Reservoir Level (FRL) = 1207.01 m
Minimum Drawdown level (MDDL)= 1188.1 m
Effective Storage at FRL = 49.87 MCM
Generation potential at FRL = 65.62 MU

Power generation
Panniyar Power House in Vellathooval village, Konnathadi Grama Panchayat, on the left bank of Muthirapuzha, generates 30 MW of electricity using 2 turbines of 15 MW each. Annual production is 158 MU. In 2003, the project was upgraded from 30 MW to 32.4 MW.

References

Periyar (river)
Dams in Kerala
Dams in Idukki district